Tom Brandt (born December 1, 1959) is an American farmer, engineer, and politician serving as a member of the Nebraska Legislature from the 32nd district. Elected in November 2018, he assumed office on January 9, 2019.

Early life and education 
Brandt was born in Beatrice, Nebraska. After graduating from Tri-County Middle/Senior High School in 1978, he earned a Bachelor of Science degree in agricultural economics and mechanized agriculture from the University of Nebraska–Lincoln in 1982.

Career 
Prior to entering politics, Brandt worked as an industrial engineer at Oscar Mayer, Louis Rich, and IBP. He was elected to the Nebraska Legislature in November 2018 and assumed office on January 9, 2019. Brandt was a member of the Farm Credit Services of America Advisory Council, Southeast Nebraska Corn Growers, and Board of Directors of the Farmers Cooperative Dorchester.

Electoral history

References 

1959 births
Living people
Farmers from Nebraska
Engineers from Nebraska
Republican Party Nebraska state senators
People from Beatrice, Nebraska
University of Nebraska–Lincoln alumni